Oirata or Woirata (also known as Maaro) is a Timor–Alor–Pantar language spoken on the island of Kisar in Indonesia, and by some people in Ambon. Ethnologue reports an SIL figure of 1,200 speakers from 1987. It is closely related to Fataluku, of which it is sometimes considered to be a dialect.

Phonology

Vowels 
Oirata has five vowels:

Consonants 
Oirata has 13 consonants:

References

External links

 Oirata Wordlist at the Austronesian Basic Vocabulary Database
 Woirata Maro (Oirata People) film

Languages of Indonesia
Oirata–Makasai languages